Beverly is a historic home located at Princess Anne, Somerset County, Maryland, United States. It is a -story, Federal-style, Flemish bond brick dwelling measuring 40 feet by 60 feet. It was built by Nehemiah King II between 1785 and 1796. The interior of the house was partially destroyed by fire in 1937 but was restored from plans.

The house was listed on the National Register of Historic Places in 1973.

Napoleon rescue plot
King became a friend of Jérôme Bonaparte through his marriage in 1803 to Betsy Patterson of Baltimore. The home was included in a plot to rescue Napoleon from exile on St. Helena Island, when plans were made for the Emperor to be transported up the Chesapeake Bay and into the Manokin River, where he was to arrive at Beverly through a tunnel leading under the house from the nearby creek. Napoleon died before the rescue was attempted.

See also
 Kingston Hall, another King family house in Somerset County

References

External links
, including photo from 1996, at Maryland Historical Trust

Houses completed in 1796
Houses in Somerset County, Maryland
Houses on the National Register of Historic Places in Maryland
Georgian architecture in Maryland
Federal architecture in Maryland
National Register of Historic Places in Somerset County, Maryland
1796 establishments in Maryland